Conger Sound, also known as Conger Inlet, is a fjord in Peary Land, far northern Greenland. 

The sound was first put on the map at the time of the Lady Franklin Bay Expedition led by Adolphus Greely. It was named after U.S. Senator Omar D. Conger, a sponsor of the venture.

Geography

It opens to the frozen Lincoln Sea in the north, between Cape Kane in the east and Cape Christiansen in the west. To the south it opens to the inner section of Weyprecht Fjord.

See also
List of fjords of Greenland

References

External links
North Greenland Glacier Velocities and Calf Ice Production - Polarforschung 60 (1): 1-23, 1990
Fjords of Greenland
Peary Land